The 33rd Finale des Jeux de l'Acadie were held from June 29 to July 3, 2012 in the Municipality of Argyle, Nova Scotia. This marked only the second time in the 32-year history of the Acadian Games that Nova Scotia hosted a Finale with Argyle being the first rural area of the province to so.

The Municipality of Argyle

The region of Par-en-Bas embraces all the Lobster Bay are of southwestern Nova Scotia. With 6240 French-speaking inhabitants of a total population estimated at 9,000 people, Par-en-Bas is one of the two areas of the Province (the other is Clare) where Francophones are the majority.

Its location at the southwestern extreme of Nova Scotia along with the moderating effects of the maritime climate generates some of the mildest winters in the province. The spring and summer are relatively cool and often tinged with fog created by the meeting of the warm currents of the Gulf Stream and the colder Labrador Current.

La Finale

The delegations

Sports

Here is the current sports programming in the Jeux de l'Acadie:

  Athletics
  Badminton
  Basketball
  Mini handball

  Softball
  Soccer
  Tennis
  Volleyball

An educational component consists of a sport selected by the host municipality through its Organizing Committee (COFJA). The goals of this component are to raise awareness about a sport little known or poorly developed in the eight regions making up the League of the Acadian Games inc. and initiating the Francophone youth to practice different sports. Sports already on the agenda of the Acadian Games are excluded from this component.

Participation in the educational component is for everyone (parents, spectators, officials, coaches,...). Priority is always given to accredited sports athletes registered for the Jeux de l'Acadie.

This year, the educational component will be:

 Golf

Calendar
Here is the calendar for the Finale.

Medal table

National multi-sport events
Multi-sport events in Canada
Sport in Nova Scotia
Yarmouth County
Acadian culture
Finale des Jeux de l'Acadie
Finale des Jeux de l'Acadie
Finale des Jeux de l'Acadie
Finale des Jeux de l'Acadie